Rampell is a surname. Notable people with the surname include:

Catherine Rampell (born 1984), American journalist
Linda Rampell (born 1971), Swedish design theorist, critic, lecturer and author